Taekwondo was contested at the 2015 Summer Universiade from May 7 to 13 at the Chosun University Gymnasium in Gwangju, South Korea.

Medal summary

Medal table

Events

Men's events

Women's events

Mixed events

References

Universiade
2015 Summer Universiade events
2015
International taekwondo competitions hosted by South Korea